Damn Yankees may refer to:

 Damn Yankees, a musical comedy with a book by George Abbott and Douglass Wallop and music and lyrics by Richard Adler and Jerry Ross
 Damn Yankees (film), a 1958 musical film based on the musical comedy of the same name
 Damn Yankees (band), an American hard rock supergroup
 Damn Yankees (album), their 1990 debut album

See also
Damnyankee
Carpetbagger
New York Yankees (disambiguation)